John Tobin (born May 29, 1963) is retired male amateur boxer from Grenada, who fought at the 1988 Summer Olympics in the men's middleweight division.

References

Grenadian male boxers
Living people
Middleweight boxers
Boxers at the 1988 Summer Olympics
Olympic boxers of Grenada
1963 births